The Five(ish) Doctors Reboot is a 2013 comedy spoof and homage to the British science fiction television programme Doctor Who. It appeared on the BBC Red Button service after the broadcast of "The Day of the Doctor", the official 50th anniversary special. The programme was written and directed by Peter Davison, who stars alongside fellow former Doctor actors Sylvester McCoy, Colin Baker and Paul McGann. It features appearances from then-stars of the show Matt Smith and Jenna Coleman as well as former stars David Tennant and John Barrowman. Additionally, then-Doctor Who executive producer Steven Moffat, his predecessor Russell T Davies and numerous others connected to the programme all appear as themselves in a more or less parodic manner.

The plot focuses on the fictionalised Davison, Baker and McCoy, who become disgruntled after discovering they haven't been invited to take part in the production of the Doctor Who 50th anniversary special. The trio become embroiled in misadventures as they attempt to sneak onto the set of the official Doctor Who 50th anniversary special.

The Five(ish) Doctors Reboot was nominated for the 2014 Hugo Award for Best Dramatic Presentation (Short Form), (along with "The Day of the Doctor", An Adventure in Space and Time, "The Name of the Doctor", and episodes of Game of Thrones and Orphan Black).

Plot

In a park, actors Sean Pertwee and Olivia Colman discuss their upcoming projects. However, both reveal that they have not received calls about appearing in The Five(ish) Doctors Reboot, with Colman complaining as she believes that she is "usually in everything".

On Christmas Day 2012, Fifth Doctor actor Peter Davison watches "The Snowmen" with his sons, Louis and Joel. They remark on the upcoming 50th anniversary special and speculate as to whether Davison will be invited to return or if it will simply feature the most recent two Doctors, David Tennant and Matt Smith. Davison has a dream where he is invited back and given special treatment, ending with a vision of Janet Fielding telling him that none of the old Doctors will be asked to return. Over the next couple of months, he, Sixth Doctor actor Colin Baker and Seventh Doctor actor Sylvester McCoy desperately await a call inviting them to star in the special. A disillusioned Davison attends a convention, where he is unrecognised by a hotel receptionist and asked by fans if he has heard about appearing in the episode. He calls Doctor Who executive producer Steven Moffat, who is more interested in playing with his action figures, and deletes his messages from Davison, as well as Baker and McCoy who have also called about appearing (McCoy mentions appearing in The Hobbit: An Unexpected Journey and Baker mentions doing I'm a Celebrity...Get Me Out of Here!).

At another convention appearance, Davison, Baker and McCoy all eye Eighth Doctor actor Paul McGann suspiciously. They discuss inviting Fourth Doctor actor Tom Baker to help them get involved, but when they call him he is revealed to be stuck in the Time Vortex again. McGann, having received no Doctor Who news from his agent, says he wants in on their plans – "work permitting, obviously". After the convention, McCoy returns to New Zealand to continue filming The Hobbit, but decides to return to England after director Peter Jackson leaves him sitting around doing nothing. Davison's scheme is revealed to involve the three of them (McGann has work commitments) protesting with picket signs outside the BBC Television Centre in London. Meanwhile, back in New Zealand, McCoy's disappearance has ruined a scene with Ian McKellen, though McKellen himself says to Jackson that the scene might be "a slight improvement" without McCoy. In London, a passing John Barrowman informs the three actors that Doctor Who filming now takes place in Cardiff. Barrowman abandons his secret wife and children to drive the trio there, singing show tunes all the way and giving them each a copy of one of his CDs.

The former Doctors enter the Doctor Who Experience, steal their old costumes, and with the help of Tennant (Davison's son-in-law) are able to infiltrate Roath Lock and get onto the set of the 50th anniversary special, "The Day of the Doctor". They are initially unsure how to proceed with getting in the special, but end up taking the place of the three Dalek operators after locking them in their room. After a close call with some security guards which leads to the trio having to hide back on the set, they manage to escape and catch a bus back to London. Davison receives a call and ignores it; it turns out to be former Doctor Who executive producer Russell T Davies asking for a part in Davison's project, as he has also been left out of the 50th anniversary celebrations.

In the coda, Moffat deletes the scene where the former Doctors play Daleks. However, when Moffat's editor reviews another scene, he sees the former Doctors evade the on-set security guards by hiding under shrouds in the undergallery set; the editor conceals this from Moffat, ensuring that the former Doctors appear in the special after all.

Cast (in order of appearance)
Most of the actors appear as themselves. The summary below lists their original connection to Doctor Who.
 Sean Pertwee – son of actor Jon Pertwee (the Third Doctor)
 Olivia Colman – "Mother" in the episode "The Eleventh Hour" (2010) and David Tennant and Thirteenth Doctor actor Jodie Whittaker's co-star on the ITV show Broadchurch
 Peter Davison – Fifth Doctor
 Louis Davison, Joel Davison – The sons of Peter Davison
 Matt Smith – Eleventh Doctor
 Jenna Coleman – played Clara Oswald, companion to the Eleventh and Twelfth Doctors
 Steven Moffat – Executive Producer and lead writer of Doctor Who from 2010–2017
 Heddi-Joy Taylor-Welch – Doctor Who runner and 3rd assistant director from 2007–2013
 Louisa Cavell – Doctor Who assistant director in 2013
 Lauren Kilcar – Costume assistant, "The Day of the Doctor" (2013)
 James DeHaviland – Doctor Who 2nd assistant director in 2006 and since 2008
 Janet Fielding – played Tegan Jovanka, companion of the Fourth, Fifth and Thirteenth Doctors
 Sylvester McCoy – Seventh Doctor
 Colin Baker – Sixth Doctor
 Rhys Thomas – comedian, actor, writer and Doctor Who fan
 Georgia Tennant – played Jenny in "The Doctor's Daughter" (2008). Georgia is the daughter of Peter Davison (Fifth Doctor), and is the wife of David Tennant (Tenth and Fourteenth Doctors). She also was the producer of The Five(ish) Doctors Reboot, under her married name Georgia Tennant.
 Olivia Darnley – actress, friend of Georgia Tennant, and then-partner of Adam James who appeared in the Doctor Who special "Planet of the Dead"
 Niky Wardley – played Tamsin Drew, companion to the Eighth Doctor in audio dramas and friend of Catherine Tate, who played companion Donna Noble
 Marion Baker – wife of Colin Baker
 Katy Manning – played Jo Grant, companion to the Third Doctor
 Louise Jameson – played Leela, companion to the Fourth Doctor
 Carole Ann Ford – played Susan Foreman, granddaughter of the First Doctor
 Deborah Watling – played Victoria Waterfield, companion to the Second Doctor
 Sophie Aldred – played Ace, companion to the Seventh and Thirteenth Doctors
 Sarah Sutton – played Nyssa, companion to the Fourth and Fifth Doctors
 Lalla Ward – played Romana II, companion to the Fourth Doctor. Was married to Tom Baker, the Fourth Doctor, from 1980 to 1982.
 John Leeson – voice of K-9 the robotic dog and companion of the Fourth and Tenth Doctors 
 Anneke Wills – played Polly, companion to the First and Second Doctors
 Lisa Bowerman – played Karra and Bernice Summerfield, companion to the Seventh Doctor in audio dramas
 Matthew Waterhouse – played Adric, companion to the Fourth and Fifth Doctors
 Paul McGann – Eighth Doctor
 Jon Culshaw – impersonating the voice of Tom Baker (the Fourth Doctor)
 Jemma Churchill – voiced Lady Forleon in the Doctor Who audio drama, Creatures of Beauty
 Lucy Baker, Bindy Baker, Lally Baker, Rosie Baker – Colin Baker's daughters
 Bruno du Bois  – assistant director of The Hobbit: An Unexpected Journey, in which Sylvester McCoy played Radagast the Brown 
 Peter Jackson – director of The Hobbit: An Unexpected Journey and Doctor Who fan
 Ian McKellen – voiced the Great Intelligence in the episode "The Snowmen", also plays Gandalf in The Hobbit: An Unexpected Journey.
 John Barrowman – played Captain Jack Harkness with the Ninth, Tenth and Thirteenth Doctor, and in the spin-off Torchwood.
 Sarah Churm – plays John Barrowman's secret wife. She also played Sarah Braithwaite alongside Peter Davison in At Home with the Braithwaites.
 Alice Knight – plays John Barrowman's (secret) elder daughter. 
 Olive Tennant – plays John Barrowman's (secret) younger daughter. In real life, she is the daughter of David and Georgia Tennant.
 Nick Jordan – staff member at Doctor Who Experience 
 Brad Kelly – commercial manager of the Doctor Who Experience
 David Tennant – the Tenth and Fourteenth Doctors, married to Peter Davison's daughter Georgia
 Richard Cookson – script editor for the 50th anniversary special, "The Day of the Doctor"
 Elizabeth Morton – wife of Peter Davison
 Marcus Elliott – plays a security guard. Prolific supporting artist from the revival series, also known as Marcus Elliot.
 Ty Tennant – son of Georgia Tennant and adopted son of David Tennant
 Barnaby Edwards – principal Dalek operator, director of several Doctor Who audio plays at Big Finish Productions and long-term partner of Nicholas Pegg
 Nicholas Pegg – principal Dalek operator, writer and director of several Doctor Who audio plays at Big Finish Productions and long-term partner of Barnaby Edwards
 David Troughton – plays a Dalek operator. Son of Patrick Troughton (the Second Doctor). Appeared in The Enemy of the World (1967–68), The War Games (1969), The Curse of Peladon (1972) and "Midnight" (2008). Appeared in A Very Peculiar Practice with Peter Davison.
 Nicholas Briggs – plays a Dalek operator. He is the voice artist of several Doctor Who monsters including the Daleks, director and writer of several Doctor Who audio plays (as well as the overall executive producer) at Big Finish Productions.
 Frank Skinner – plays a Dalek operator. He is a comedian and Doctor Who fan. He would go on to play Perkins in the Twelfth Doctor story "Mummy on the Orient Express".
 Adam Paul Harvey – former partner of Georgia Tennant
 Derek Ritchie – Doctor Who script editor from  2013–2016
 Michael Houghton – plays a security guard.  As Mike Houghton he was an editor in the Tom Baker and Davison eras, as well as on Davison's show A Very Peculiar Practice
 Dan Starkey – originally played Sontaran Commander Skorr in "The Sontaran Stratagem", has played the character Strax from 2011–2014 on television and since 2016 in Big Finish audios
 Russell T Davies – Doctor Who writer and executive producer from 2005–2010 and since 2022; launched the revived series, with the Ninth Doctor, in 2005
 Des Hughes – Doctor Who line producer from 2012–2013
 Gabriella Ricci – Doctor Who assistant production coordinator 2012–2013
 Sandra Cosfeld – production secretary for the episode "Asylum of the Daleks"
 Christian Brassington – actor who played Alfred Stahlbaum in the Doctor Who audio drama The Silver Turk, writing partner of Georgia Tennant, and husband of Jennie Fava, who assistant directed the special and several series of Doctor Who.

Jemma Redgrave appears in the final scene on the computer monitor with Smith and Coleman. John Hurt's voice can be heard through archive recordings from "The Day of the Doctor" with Smith and Tennant in the scene where Davison, Baker and McCoy arrive on set. Both are uncredited for these appearances.

Davison originally wrote a part for Tom Baker. As Baker failed to respond to his emails, Davison used the same clip of unfinished Doctor Who story Shada (by way of The Five Doctors) to jokingly explain his absence.

Reviews
Ben Lawrence writing in The Telegraph gave the programme 4 stars (out of 5), describing it as "a sweet, often funny homage to the show," concluding that it "was both a satisfying in-joke for Whovians and a naughty dig at the neediness of actors."  Comparing the programme to the 50th anniversary special, Los Angeles Times Television Critic, Robert Lloyd, described it as "equally wonderful in its way".

Home media
After months of speculation, on 23 July 2014 it was officially announced that The Five(ish) Doctors Reboot would be released on DVD and Blu-ray on 8 September 2014 alongside "The Name of the Doctor", "The Night of the Doctor", "The Day of the Doctor", "The Time of the Doctor" and An Adventure in Space and Time as part of the limited edition "50th Anniversary Collectors Edition" boxset.

Proposed sequel
In June 2014, Paul McGann stated that production had begun on a sequel to the special. No release date, plot or cast details were offered. However, in July, Colin Baker contradicted McGann's earlier statement by telling Flicks and the City: "All I know is when I last spoke to Peter [Davison], the reaction to Five-ish Doctors has been so positive that we discussed whether it was a good idea to do another one and we agreed that we didn’t want to do one that was a pale imitation of the first. That would be anti-climactic ... We have to come up with a really good idea first. There’s a couple of possibilities floating around, but nothing is set in stone. Clearly doing one about the 51st anniversary isn’t going to be interesting. It’s got to be about something else." At a Doctor Who convention in March 2023, Sylvester McCoy stated that there were plans to make a sequel for the show's 60th anniversary, but that the BBC would not allow it.

See also
The Three Doctors
The Five Doctors
The Two Doctors

References

External links
BBC Website
link to film

British comedy
BBC Cymru Wales television shows
Doctor Who spin-offs